Queen of the Road is a 1984 Australian television film about two female truckies.

References

External links

Australian television films
1984 television films
1984 films
1980s English-language films
1980s Australian films